People's Power (Poder Popular) was a political movement in Colombia. Founded in 1981 by Ernesto Samper Pizano (later president of the country). PP evolved out of the Liberal Party of Colombia. Former president of Colombia, Álvaro Uribe, was a member of PP. PP had a youth organization called Juventud del Poder Popular. PP disappeared in the beginning of the 1990s and most of its membership returned to the mainstream Liberal Party.

See also
Liberalism in Colombia
Colombia
Liberal parties in Colombia